Super Girls also known as Icon Girls, are a Hong Kong Cantopop girl group formed by Stars Shine International. They are managed by Jam Cast Management HK Ltd. The group has five members: Aka Chio, Heidi Lee, Yanny Chan, Cheronna Ng, and Jessica Tsoi. They disbanded in February 2022.

Discography

Album
 超女時代 (2012)

EP
 Blossom (2015)

Filmography

Drama

References

External links
 
 

2010 establishments in Hong Kong
Musical groups established in 2010
Musical groups disestablished in 2022
Cantopop musical groups
Hong Kong girl groups
Hong Kong idols
Vocal quintets